The 2012–13 season was East Stirlingshire's nineteenth consecutive season in the Scottish Third Division, having been relegated from the Scottish Second Division at the end of the 1993–94 season, following league reconstruction. East Stirlingshire also competed in the Challenge Cup, League Cup and the Scottish Cup.

Summary

Season
East Stirlingshire finished tenth in the Scottish Third Division. They reached the Quarter-final of the Challenge Cup, the first round of the League Cup and the third round of the Scottish Cup.

Results & fixtures

Pre-season

Scottish Third Division

Scottish Challenge Cup

Scottish League Cup

Scottish Cup

Player statistics

Squad 
Last updated 13 May 2013 

 

 

|}

Disciplinary record
Includes all competitive matches.
Last updated 13 May 2013

Team statistics

League table

Division summary

Transfers

Players in

Players out

References

East Stirlingshire F.C. seasons
East Stirlingshire